The 2004–05 Toronto Maple Leafs season was the 88th season of the franchise, 78th season as the Maple Leafs. The entire season's games were cancelled as a result of the 2004–05 NHL lockout.

Offseason
Key dates prior to the start of the season:

The 2004 NHL Entry Draft took place in Raleigh, North Carolina, on June 26, 2004.
The free agency period began on July 1.

Schedule
The Maple Leafs preseason and regular season schedules were announced on July 14, 2004.

|-
| 1 || September 24 || @ Montreal Canadiens
|-
| 2 || September 25 || @ Ottawa Senators
|-
| 3 || September 28 || Buffalo Sabres
|-
| 4 || October 1 || @ Detroit Red Wings
|-
| 5 || October 2 || Ottawa Senators
|-
| 6 || October 5 || Montreal Canadiens
|-
| 7 || October 8 || @ Buffalo Sabres
|-
| 8 || October 9 || Detroit Red Wings
|-

|-
| 1 || October 15 || @ New Jersey Devils
|-
| 2 || October 16 || Ottawa Senators
|-
| 3 || October 19 || Florida Panthers
|-
| 4 || October 21 || @ Ottawa Senators
|-
| 5 || October 23 || @ Montreal Canadiens
|-
| 6 || October 26 || Los Angeles Kings
|-
| 7 || October 29 || @ Carolina Hurricanes
|-
| 8 || October 30 || New York Rangers
|-
| 9 || November 2 || Tampa Bay Lightning
|-
| 10 || November 6 || Boston Bruins
|-
| 11 || November 9 || @ New York Islanders
|-
| 12 || November 11 || @ New York Rangers
|-
| 13 || November 13 || @ Boston Bruins
|-
| 14 || November 15 || @ Buffalo Sabres
|-
| 15 || November 16 || Dallas Stars
|-
| 16 || November 18 || @ New Jersey Devils
|-
| 17 || November 20 || Philadelphia Flyers
|-
| 18 || November 23 || Washington Capitals
|-
| 19 || November 27 || Buffalo Sabres
|-
| 20 || November 30 || @ Calgary Flames
|-
| 21 || December 2 || @ Edmonton Oilers
|-
| 22 || December 4 || @ Vancouver Canucks
|-
| 23 || December 7 || Boston Bruins
|-
| 24 || December 9 || @ Columbus Blue Jackets
|-
| 25 || December 11 || Montreal Canadiens
|-
| 26 || December 13 || @ Buffalo Sabres
|-
| 27 || December 14 || New York Islanders
|-
| 28 || December 16 || Atlanta Thrashers
|-
| 29 || December 18 || Calgary Flames
|-
| 30 || December 21 || @ Boston Bruins
|-
| 31 || December 23 || @ Carolina Hurricanes
|-
| 32 || December 27 || @ Colorado Avalanche
|-
| 33 || December 28 || @ St. Louis Blues
|-
| 34 || December 30 || @ Nashville Predators
|-
| 35 || January 1 || @ Boston Bruins
|-
| 36 || January 4 || Boston Bruins
|-
| 37 || January 6 || @ Atlanta Thrashers
|-
| 38 || January 8 || New Jersey Devils
|-
| 39 || January 10 || @ Ottawa Senators
|-
| 40 || January 11 || Pittsburgh Penguins
|-
| 41 || January 14 || @ Chicago Blackhawks
|-
| 42 || January 15 || @ Detroit Red Wings
|-
| 43 || January 18 || New York Islanders
|-
| 44 || January 20 || @ Ottawa Senators
|-
| 45 || January 22 || @ Montreal Canadiens
|-
| 46 || January 24 || Carolina Hurricanes
|-
| 47 || January 26 || @ Florida Panthers
|-
| 48 || January 27 || @ Tampa Bay Lightning
|-
| 49 || January 29 || Ottawa Senators
|-
| 50 || February 1 || @ Buffalo Sabres
|-
| 51 || February 3 || Washington Capitals
|-
| 52 || February 5 || Vancouver Canucks
|-
| 53 || February 7 || San Jose Sharks
|-
| 54 || February 8 || @ New York Rangers
|-
| 55 || February 10 || Pittsburgh Penguins
|-
| 56 || February 15 || Carolina Hurricanes
|-
| 57 || February 18 || Buffalo Sabres
|-
| 58 || February 19 || Edmonton Oilers
|-
| 59 || February 22 || Florida Panthers
|-
| 60 || February 24 || New Jersey Devils
|-
| 61 || February 26 || Atlanta Thrashers
|-
| 62 || March 1 || @ Tampa Bay Lightning
|-
| 63 || March 2 || @ Florida Panthers
|-
| 64 || March 5 || Montreal Canadiens
|-
| 65 || March 8 || Philadelphia Flyers
|-
| 66 || March 10 || @ Philadelphia Flyers
|-
| 67 || March 12 || Ottawa Senators
|-
| 68 || March 13 || @ Pittsburgh Penguins
|-
| 69 || March 15 || Anaheim Mighty Ducks
|-
| 70 || March 17 || Minnesota Wild
|-
| 71 || March 19 || New York Rangers
|-
| 72 || March 20 || @ Washington Capitals
|-
| 73 || March 22 || Phoenix Coyotes
|-
| 74 || March 25 || @ Atlanta Thrashers
|-
| 75 || March 26 || @ Philadelphia Flyers
|-
| 76 || March 28 || Tampa Bay Lightning
|-
| 77 || March 31 || @ Montreal Canadiens
|-
| 78 || April 2 || Montreal Canadiens
|-
| 79 || April 3 || @ Pittsburgh Penguins
|-
| 80 || April 5 || @ New York Islanders
|-
| 81 || April 8 || @ Washington Capitals
|-
| 82 || April 9 || Buffalo Sabres
|-

Transactions
The Maple Leafs were involved in the following transactions from June 8, 2004, the day after the deciding game of the 2004 Stanley Cup Finals, through February 16, 2005, the day the  season was officially cancelled.

Trades
The Maple Leafs did not make any trades.

Players acquired

Players lost

Signings

Draft picks
The 2004 NHL Entry Draft was the 42nd NHL Entry Draft.

 Toronto's picks at the 2004 NHL Entry Draft in Raleigh, North Carolina.

Farm teams
 The Maple Leafs' top affiliate was the St. John's Maple Leafs in the American Hockey League. This was the last season this team played in St. John's before it relocated as the Toronto Marlies.
 The Maple Leafs' secondary affiliate was the Pensacola Ice Pilots in the ECHL.

Notes

References

 

Toronto Maple Leafs season, 2004-05
Toronto Maple Leafs seasons
Toronto